The Bahram Jung Mosque is a mosque situated in the neighbourhood of Nandanam in Chennai, India. The mosque was constructed between 1789 and 1795 by Muhammad Abdullah Qadir Nawaz Khan Bahadur Bahram Jung, a poet in the court of Muhammad Ali Khan Wallajah, the Nawab of the Carnatic.

Bahram Jung and his brother, Hafiz Ahmad Khan incurred huge expenses on part of the Carnatic state that on the death of Wallajah's successor Umdat ul-Umara, the lands belonging to the brothers were confiscated by the East India Company.

References 

 

Mosques in Chennai
Religious buildings and structures completed in 1795